UFC on Fox: Henderson vs. Diaz (also known as UFC on Fox 5) is a mixed martial arts event that was held by the Ultimate Fighting Championship on December 8, 2012, at KeyArena in Seattle, Washington. It was broadcast live on Fox Sports.

Background
As a result of the cancellation of UFC 151, bouts between Tim Means vs. Abel Trujillo, Daron Cruickshank vs. Henry Martinez
and Dennis Siver vs. Eddie Yagin were rescheduled for this event.

Rafaello Oliveira was expected to face Michael Chiesa at the event.  However, Oliveira was forced out of the bout with a broken hand, and replaced by Marcus LeVesseur.  Then, the week of the event, Chiesa was forced out of the bout with LeVesseur with an undisclosed illness and the bout was scrapped altogether.  Also, on the day of the weigh-ins for the event, Tim Means was forced from his bout with Abel Trujillo after sustaining a head injury caused by a fall in a hotel sauna.  LeVesseur replaced Means in the bout.

T.J. Dillashaw was scheduled to fight Mike Easton in the preliminary card.  However, an injury sidelined Dillashaw, who was forced out of the bout and replaced by Bryan Caraway.  Then, on November 21, it was announced that Caraway was forced out of the bout with an injury and replaced by Raphael Assunção.

Eddie Yagin was expected to face Dennis Siver at this event. However, Yagin was forced out of the bout due to a sparring injury that landed him in the hospital with swelling around his brain, and was replaced by Nam Phan.

John Cholish was expected to face Yves Edwards at the event.  However, Cholish was forced out of the bout with a groin injury and replaced by Jeremy Stephens.

Lavar Johnson was scheduled to face Brendan Schaub at the event.  However, Johnson was forced out of the bout with a groin injury and Schaub was pulled from the card altogether.

At the weigh-ins, Henry Martinez came in heavy weighing in at 158.8 lb.  Martinez was given two hours to cut to the lightweight maximum of 156 pounds, but he elected instead to surrender a percentage of his fight purse to his opponent Daron Cruickshank.

At the pre-weigh-in press conference, UFC, as part of merging Strikeforce champions into the UFC, officially named Strikeforce champion Ronda Rousey the women's bantamweight champion and presented her with a belt.

Results

Bonus awards
Fighters were awarded $65,000 bonuses.
Fight of the Night: Scott Jorgensen vs. John AlbertKnockout of the Night: Yves EdwardsSubmission of the Night: Scott JorgensenReported Payout

The following is the reported payout to the fighters as reported to the Washington State Department of Licensing. It does not include sponsor money and also does not include the UFC's traditional "fight night" bonuses.Benson Henderson: $78,000 (includes $39,000 win bonus) def. Nate Diaz: $50,000Alexander Gustafsson: $60,000 (includes $30,000 win bonus) def. Maurício Rua: $175,000Rory MacDonald: $42,000 (includes $21,000 win bonus) def. B.J. Penn: $150,000Matt Brown: $54,000 (includes $27,000 win bonus) def. Mike Swick: $48,000Yves Edwards: $32,000 (includes $16,000 win bonus) def. Jeremy Stephens: $24,000Raphael Assunção: $38,000 (includes $19,000 win bonus) def. Mike Easton: $25,000Ramsey Nijem: $20,000 (includes $10,000 win bonus) def. Joe Proctor: $8,000Daron Cruickshank: $16,000 (includes $8,000 win bonus) def. Henry Martinez: $8,000 ^Abel Trujillo: $12,000 (includes $6,000 win bonus) def. Marcus LeVesseur: $8,000Dennis Siver: $62,000 (includes $31,000 win bonus) def. Nam Phan: $10,000Scott Jorgensen: $41,000 (includes $20,500 win bonus) def. John Albert:' $10,000

^ Henry Martinez was reportedly fined 20 percent of his purse for failing to make the required weight for his fight. The Washington State Department of Licensing's initial report did not include information on the penalty.''

See also
List of UFC events
2012 in UFC

References

External links
Official UFC past events page
UFC events results at Sherdog.com

Fox UFC
2012 in mixed martial arts
Mixed martial arts in Washington (state)
Sports competitions in Seattle
2012 in sports in Washington (state)
Events in Seattle